Tākou Himiona Tūpākihi Kāmira (1876/77 – 28 August 1953 as noted on his headstone at Matihetihe marae). Tākou as he was commonly known was a Māori tohunga, historian and genealogist. Of Māori descent, his principal Hapū were Te Taomauī and Te Hokokeha, and his Iwi were Te Rarawa, Te Aupōuri, Ngāti Kahu, Ngāti Whātua and Ngāpuhi. He was born in Reena, Northland, New Zealand.

References

1870s births
1953 deaths
20th-century New Zealand historians
New Zealand genealogists
Te Rarawa people
Te Aupōuri people
New Zealand Māori writers
People from the Northland Region